Irit Ben-Abba (aka Irit Ben-Abba Vitali or Vitale) is the Israeli Ambassador to China having arrived in Beijing on January 22, 2021.

Education
1979-1982 – Graduated Cum Laude from the Hebrew University in Jerusalem, majoring in East Asian Studies and in English Linguistics
2003-2005 – MBA, Executive MBA Studies at the Hebrew University

Career
Ben-Abba has served as Ambassador to Albania from 2004 until 2006 (concurrent with Bosnia and Herzegovina, Greece (2014-2019), North Macedonia (2004-2006) and the Philippines (2000-2004).. She was also Deputy Director General of Economic Affairs at the Ministry of Foreign Affairs.

References

Ambassadors of Israel to Albania
Ambassadors of Israel to Bosnia and Herzegovina
Ambassadors of Israel to China
Ambassadors of Israel to Greece
Ambassadors of Israel to North Macedonia
Ambassadors of Israel to the Philippines
Hebrew University of Jerusalem alumni
Israeli women ambassadors